Serine/threonine-protein phosphatase 6 catalytic subunit is an enzyme that in humans is encoded by the PPP6C gene.

Interactions 

PPP6C has been shown to interact with IGBP1.

References

Further reading